is a puzzle video game developed by Aiky (in behalf of Compile) and released by Taito at 2003 for the Neo Geo. It is one of the final video game titles developed for the platform, as well as the last Neo Geo titles developed by third-party companies. Bandai released a port for the PlayStation 2 at 2004, with several improvements and new characters.

Gameplay 

The game has a pair of 7x12 grids, where the pieces (called Pochis or Nyaas) fall in pairs (similar to Puyo Puyo). It is operated with an 8-way lever and 3 buttons (left rotation, right rotation and "trigger"). Unlike Puyo Puyo and SNK's own Puzzled, the player can accumulate as many pieces of the same color as they want and make them disappear when he wants, by changing a falling piece into a "trigger", in order to clear the accumulated pieces of the same color and forming chain reaction. and send nuisance pieces to the opponent. When the skull mark shown on the screen is reached (at the top of the center column), the game ends.

Modes 

The game has three modes:

 One player vs CPU
 One player in Infinite mode
 Two players

Development 
This work was announced under a commercial alliance between Compile and Taito, and was initially scheduled to run on the NAOMI arcade boards in mid-September 2002. However, after that, the launch was repeatedly delayed due to Compile bankruptcy, finally being launched in late 2003 for the Neo Geo, with then-reformed SNK Playmore would helping publishing the game. The characters that were announced at the time of the development of the NAOMI version that were not released in the arcade version, were added as additional characters for the PS2 version released by Bandai.

Since November 2005, the Aiky IP, including this game, were transferred to D4 Enterprise which having re-releasing many Neo Geo titles (excluding this game) to the Virtual Console for the Wii.

Plot 
A thousand years after that festival. In the sky where several gods live, the dog god "Pochi", who is an idol god and the cat god "Nyaa", bets on the best idols and competes in the "Pochi and Nyaa festival" once every a thousand years. The result will determine which of the heavenly gods will be spoiled in the next 1000 years.

Prim has received an invitation from God, to get the "pumpkin pudding" as a reward, they are supposed to participate in the festival "Pochi and Nyaa".

Characters

God 
It appears as a block to operate during the gameplay.

 
 They are the two worshiped gods. Both are rivals. Nyaa appears as the P1 block, while Pochi appears as the 2P block

Playable characters 

 
 The main character. An egg wizard that lives with his parents and his sister in the port city of Solsiel.
 Is a playable character in the story mode
 
 The spirit of the world tree has just been born. A young woman who is a plant race.
 
 A user of Ancient Arts, a battle technique that guides magic through dance.
 
 A strange demon-mage
 
 A white bear that is worshiped as a sacred beast and a mountain god in his hometown.
 
 The spirit of a hero who was active 300 years ago. A stubborn stubborn. The young man of the same name appeared in the i-mode version of "Magical Story" (it is not known if he is the same person).
 
 The older brother of Jurad, a judge who judges the death of a deceased person for life in the Court of Justice. He has a "book of the past" in which he writes all the past and future of the desired opponent in the trial. Although it does not appear in the main game, it appears on the official website and manga at that time as a mysterious man with a mask running towards the pinch of Jurard, "Red Moonlight" (He himself denies the identity).
 
 The last boss A mysterious person with a mask.

Characters introduced in the PS2 version 

 
 The father of the brothers Paradisus and Jurad. Former governor of the fifth chamber of the underworld and has full control. He gave his family to his eldest son and lived in a retired environment.
 
 A demon like a Halloween pumpkin lantern. Aggressive, impatient and mischievous. The head does not rise to Liv.
 
 A dragon-type girl with an older sister.
 
 Hidden character. Blue skin dragon He is a fiance of Song-Hwa, but he usually avoids it.
 
 Hidden character. Gravel's great grandson. A handsome hero who uses a gun with a yellow silencer.

Notes

References

See also 

 Nyoki Nyoki: Tabidachi Hen, a later video game based on this premise

External links 
 Pochi and Nyaa for the Play Station 2 - Bandai Games Channel
 
 Pochi and Nyaa at GameFAQs
 Pochi and Nyaa at Killer List of Videogames
 Pochi and Nyaa at MobyGames

2003 video games
Arcade video games
Neo Geo games
SNK Playmore games
Taito games
PlayStation 2 games
Bandai games
Puyo Puyo
Video games about cats
Video games about dogs
Video games developed in Japan